Jerome J. Valberg (born 1936) is a retired American-British philosopher, and former Senior Lecturer of Philosophy at University College London.

In 1966, Valberg received his doctorate from the University of Chicago with his dissertation, "Agency: Some Metaphysical Questions Concerning Human Action". He briefly taught at the University of Illinois and the University of Chicago before arriving at University College London, where he devoted the majority of his academic career.

Primarily working in the fields of epistemology and metaphysics, Valberg's writings are also concerned with consciousness, identity, and the problems of perception.

Valberg's notable ideas include the personal horizon concept.

He is the author of Dream, Death, and the Self and The Puzzle of Experience. He currently lives in London, UK.

References 

1936 births
Living people
American philosophers
Epistemologists
Metaphysicians
Academics of University College London
University of Chicago alumni
University of Illinois faculty